Meridarchis unitacta is a moth in the Carposinidae family. It is found in Madagascar.

This species has a wingspan of 19mm, and is characterized by its long, narrow wings, and black irrorated markings appearing greyish except for a jet-black dot below the end of the posterior side of costal triangle.

References

Natural History Museum Lepidoptera generic names catalog

Carposinidae
Moths described in 1970
Moths of Madagascar